John Dory, St Pierre or Peter's fish, refers to fish of the genus Zeus, especially Zeus faber, of widespread distribution. It is an edible demersal coastal marine fish with a laterally compressed olive-yellow body which has a large dark spot, and long spines on the dorsal fin. Its large eyes at the front of the head provide it with binocular vision and depth perception, which are important for predators. The John Dory's eye spot on the side of its body also confuses prey, which are scooped up in its big mouth.

In New Zealand, Māori know it as kuparu, and on the East Coast of the North Island, they gave some to Captain James Cook on his first voyage to New Zealand in 1769. Several casks of them were pickled.

Name
Various, often doubtful explanations are given of the origin of the name. It may be an arbitrary or jocular variation of dory (from French dorée, gilded), or an allusion to John Dory, the hero of an old ballad. Others suggest that "John" derives from the French jaune, yellow. The novel An Antarctic Mystery by Jules Verne gives another account, which has some popularity but is probably fanciful: "The legendary etymology of this piscatorial designation is Janitore, the 'door-keeper,' in allusion to St. Peter, who brought a fish said to be of that species, to Jesus at his command." Other known names for the John Dory are the "St. Pierre", or "Peter's Fish", perhaps explaining why dories were often referred to as "Peter Boats", Saint Peter being the patron saint of fishermen. A related legend says that the dark spot on the fish's flank is St. Peter's thumbprint. In the north coast of Spain, it is known commonly as San Martiño.

Morphology

The John Dory grows to a maximum size of 65 cm (2 ft) and 5 kg (12 lb) in weight. It has 10 long spines on its dorsal fin and 4 spines on its anal fin. It has microscopic, sharp scales that run around the body. The fish is an olive green color with a silver white belly and has a dark spot on its side. Its eyes are near the top of its head. It has a flat, round body shape and is a poor swimmer.

Prey and predators
The John Dory catches prey by stalking it, then extending its jaw forward in a tube-like structure to suck the fish in with some water. The water then flows out through the gills; the pre-maxillary bone, the only tooth-bearing bone in this fish, is used to grind the food. 

The John Dory has a high laterally compressed body – its body is so thin it can hardly be seen from the front. The large eyes at the front of the head provide it with the binocular vision and depth perception it needs to catch prey. This eye spot also confuses prey, which can then be sucked into its mouth.

It primarily eats smaller fish, especially schooling fish such as sardines. Occasionally it eats squid and cuttlefish.

Its main predators are sharks such as the dusky shark, and large bony fish.

Habitat
John Dory are benthopelagic coastal fish, found on the coasts of Africa, South East Asia, New Zealand, Australia, the coasts of Japan, and on the coasts of Europe. They live near the seabed, living in depths from 5 metres (15 ft) to 360 metres (1200 ft). They are normally solitary.

Reproduction and lifespan
When John Dories are 3 or 4 years of age, they are ready to reproduce. This happens around the end of winter. They are substrate scatterers, which means that they release sperm and eggs into the water to fertilize. Typical lifespan is about 12 years in the wild.

As food
The cookery writer Eliza Acton observes in her 1845 book, Modern Cookery for Private Families, that John Dory "though of uninviting appearance, is considered by some person(s) as the most delicious fish that appears at [the] table". She recommends simply baking it "very gently", avoiding drying it out in the oven.

References

Sources

External links

 
 Article on the British Sea Fishing forum: http://britishseafishing.co.uk/john-dory/
 

Zeus (fish)
Commercial fish
Fish of the Atlantic Ocean
Fish of the Indian Ocean
Fish of the Pacific Ocean
Fish of the Mediterranean Sea
Fish of the Black Sea
Fish described in 1758
Taxa named by Carl Linnaeus
Extant Oligocene first appearances